This is a list of films released in the 1920s produced in Armenia SSR or directed by Armenians or about Armenia or Armenians, ordered by year of release.

References

External links
 Armenian film at the Internet Movie Database

See also
 List of Soviet films

1920
Arm
Films